Heinrich Boell (13 September 1890, Wissembourg – 10 October 1947, Bonn) was a German organist and choir conductor.

References

1890 births
1947 deaths
German male conductors (music)
German organists
German male organists
20th-century German conductors (music)
20th-century organists
20th-century German male musicians